The Moqaddam family were the governors of the Iranian town of Maragheh between the 18th and 20th-centuries.

Originally, the Moqaddam family were supposedly tribal leaders from the Caucasus, and had moved to Iran in the late 18th-century. However, by the early 19th-century, the family was a settled people, possessing a great number of villages.

The administration of Maragheh was similar to the Qajar administration. For five generations the Moqaddams managed to have significant autonomy from the central government.

After the abolition of Moqaddam authority in 1925 by Reza Shah, the members of the dynasty were expelled. They went into exile in Azerbaijan and Turkey. The descendants of the dynasty now live in various countries, and take the surnames Mükeddem, Mükeddem-Marağayi, Etimadi-Mükeddam and others.

Governors
The Moqaddam governors of Maragheh were the following:

Ahmad Khan Moqaddam (?–1830)
Hossein Pasha Khan (1830–1848)
Eskandar Khan (late 1848–late 1890s)
Samad Khan Shoja al-Dowleh (late 1890s–1911)
Eskandar Khan Sadar Nasr (1911–1925)

References

Sources 
 
  

History of East Azerbaijan Province
Maragheh
1610 establishments in Iran
1925 disestablishments in Iran
Qajar governors